The 4th Cannes International Series Festival is a television festival that took place from 8 to 13 October 2021 in Cannes, France. It was scheduled to be held from 9 to 14 April but postponed due to COVID-19 pandemic-related concerns.

Finnish thriller comedy series Mister 8 won the Best Series award.

Juries
The following juries were named for the festival:

Competition
Nikolaj Coster-Waldau, Danish actor and screenwriter, Jury President
Sigal Avin, American-Israeli screenwriter
Naidra Ayadi, a French actress
Salvatore Esposito, Italian actor
Marco Prince, French composer

Short Form Competition
Aisling Bea, Irish actress, Jury President
Assaad Bouab, French-Moroccan actor
Marie Papillon, French actress

Official selection

In competition
The following series were selected to compete:

Short Form Competition
The following series were selected to compete:
{| class="sortable wikitable" style="width:100%; margin-bottom:4px"
|-
!scope="col"|Title
!scope="col"|Original title
!scope="col"|Creator(s)
!scope="col"|Production countrie(s)
|-style="background:#FFDEAD;"
| About Saturday
| Etter lørdag
| 
| Norway
|-
| colspan="2"|Adi Shankar's The Guardians of Justice (Will Save You!)
| 
| United States, Spain, Finland
|-
| Dumped
| Larguée
| 
| France
|-
| colspan="2"|Hudson Falls – A Ray McClane Mystery
| 
| United States
|-
| colspan="2"|i-ART|  & Marvin Gofin
| France
|-
| colspan="2"|Lockdown|  & Maarten Moerkerke
| Belgium
|-
| Pops| Батя
|  & Anton Shchukin & Anton Zaitsev
| Russia
|-
| colspan="2"|Sheker|  & Kuat Sadykov
| Kazakhstan
|-
| This Is Not a Hotel| Esto no es un hotel| 
| Argentina
|-
| Wipe Me Away| Je voudrais qu'on m'efface| 
| Canada
|}

Out of competition
The following series were screened out of competition:

Awards
The following awards were presented at the festival:
Best Series: Mister 8 by Teemu Nikki and Jani Pösö
Dior Grand Award: The Allegation by Oliver Berben and Jan Ehlert
Best Screenplay: Ferdinand von Schirach for The AllegationBest Music: Giorgio Giampa for ChristianSpecial Interpretation Prize: Countrymen by Izer Aliu and Anne Bjørnstad
Best Performance: for Pekka Strang for Mister 8High School Prize for Best Series: Countrymen by Izer Aliu and Anne Bjørnstad
Audience Award: Awake by Srđan Dragojević
Best Short Form Series: About Saturday by Liv Mari Ulla Mortensen
Dior Revelation Award for Best Short Form Series: Wipe Me Away by Eric Piccoli
Student Prize for Best Short Form Series: Lockdown by

Special awards
The following honorary awards were presented at the festival:Variety Icon Award: Connie BrittonMadame Figaro Rising Star Award: Phoebe DynevorKonbini Prix de l'Engagement: Laurie Nunn
Audience Award for French Series of the Year: Voltaire High''

References

Events postponed due to the COVID-19 pandemic
2021 in French television